Noord-Beveland ("North Beveland") is a municipality and region in the southwestern Netherlands and a former island, now part of the Walcheren-Zuid-Beveland-Noord-Beveland peninsula. 
Noord-Beveland is enclosed by the Oosterschelde estuary to the north, and the former straits, now combined lake, of Veerse Meer and Zandkreek to the south. As part of the Delta Works, dams have connected Noord-Beveland to Walcheren and Zuid-Beveland.

Population centers 

There is no village called Noord-Beveland itself.

Topography

Dutch Topographic map of the municipality of Noord-Beveland, June 2015

Ganuenta 
In Roman times, the town of Ganuenta lay north of where the village of Colijnsplaat is now, a location now covered by the water of the Oosterschelde. It was an important centre for trade. Nearby, there was a temple dedicated to the ancient regional sea goddess Nehalennia. A replica of this temple was officially opened in Colijnsplaat in August 2005.

Notable people 
 Johannis de Rijke (1842 in Colijnsplaat – 1913) a Dutch civil engineer and a foreign advisor to the Japanese government
 Eduard Flipse (1896 in Wissenkerke – 1973) a Dutch conductor and composer
 Neeltje Karelse (1926 in Kortgene – 2015) a Dutch track-and-field athlete, competed at 1948 Summer Olympics

Gallery

References

External links 

Official website (in Dutch)

 
Municipalities of Zeeland
Islands of Zeeland
Regions of Zeeland
Regions of the Netherlands
Municipalities of the Netherlands established in 1995
Rhine–Meuse–Scheldt delta